Mantidactylus ambohimitombi is a species of frog in the family Mantellidae.
It is endemic to Madagascar.
Its natural habitats are subtropical or tropical moist montane forests, subtropical or tropical high-altitude grassland, and rivers.
It is threatened by habitat loss.

References

ambohimitombi
Endemic frogs of Madagascar
Taxonomy articles created by Polbot